Héctor Luís Camacho Matías (May 24, 1962 – November 24, 2012), commonly known by his nickname "Macho" Camacho, was a Puerto Rican professional boxer and entertainer. Known for his quickness in the ring and flamboyant style, Camacho competed professionally from 1980 to 2010, and was a world champion in three weight classes. He held the WBC super featherweight title from 1983 to 1984, the WBC lightweight title from 1985 to 1987, and the WBO junior welterweight title twice between 1989 and 1992.

In a storied amateur career, Camacho won three New York Golden Gloves tournaments, beginning with the Sub-Novice 112 lbs championship in 1978. During his professional career, Camacho had many notable fights against some of the biggest names in boxing, defeating Roberto Durán twice late in Duran's career, and knocking out Sugar Ray Leonard to send him into permanent retirement. He also fought Julio César Chávez, Félix Trinidad, and Oscar De La Hoya, among others.

During his later years, Camacho expanded his popular role and appeared on a variety of Spanish-language reality television shows including Univision's' dancing show Mira Quien Baila and a weekly segment on the popular show El Gordo y La Flaca, named "Macho News". However, he also had much-publicized troubles with drug abuse and criminal charges. In 2005, Camacho was arrested for burglary, a charge to which he would later plead guilty. In 2011 he was shot at three times by would-be carjackers in San Juan, but was uninjured. In late 2012, Camacho was awaiting trial in Florida on charges of physical abuse of one of his sons.

On November 20, 2012, Camacho was shot and seriously wounded while sitting in a car outside a bar in his native Bayamón; the driver, a childhood friend, was killed in the shooting. Camacho died four days later; after he was declared clinically brain dead, his mother requested the doctors remove him from life support. After lying in repose for two days in Santurce, Camacho's remains were transported to New York for burial at the request of his mother.

Early life and amateur career
Camacho was born in Bayamón, Puerto Rico, to Héctor Luis Camacho Sr. and his wife María Matías. He was the second youngest of five children, which included a younger brother, Felix and sisters Raquel, Estrella, and Esperanza. When he was three, his parents separated, and his mother took the children with her to New York City. They lived in the James Weldon Johnson housing project in Spanish Harlem. Camacho attended local schools and ran into trouble as a teen, getting into street fights and landing in jail at fifteen. Pat Flannery, a language teacher in high school, helped the youth, teaching him to read and "acting like a father figure". When Camacho learned boxing and karate as a teenager, Flannery guided him to the Golden Gloves competitions. Demonstrating talent as a boxer, Camacho chose that sport as a career.

As an amateur, Camacho won three New York Golden Gloves Championships. Camacho won the 1978 112 lb Sub-Novice Championship, 1979 118 lb Open Championship, and 1980 119 lb Open Championship. In 1979 Camacho defeated Paul DeVorce of the Yonkers Police Athletic League in the finals to win the title, and, in 1980, Camacho defeated Tyrone Jackson in the finals to win the Championship.

In 1980 Camacho won Intercity Golden Gloves, defeating Orlando Johnson of Chicago.

Camacho completed his amateur career, having a hundred fights under his belt, with 96 wins, and 4 losses.

Camacho's nickname of "Macho" has been explained in various ways. According to his father, he gave him the nickname because he was his youngest son. According to the New York Times, his mentor Pat Flannery is the one who gave him the nickname during his teens. According to Camacho himself, the nickname came as a result of American co-workers at a factory who couldn't pronounce his last name.

Amateur Highlights
Camacho's major achievements in the amateur boxing:
  1978 New York Golden Gloves Flyweight Sub-Novice Champion
  1979 New York Golden Gloves Bantamweight Open Champion
  1979 Intercity Golden Gloves 119-Pound Champion
  1980 New York Golden Gloves Bantamweight Open Champion
  1980 Intercity Golden Gloves 125-Pound Champion

Professional career
After a stellar amateur career, Camacho began a quick rise through the professional rankings, first in the featherweight and then in the junior-lightweight division. He was so confident that he claimed he could beat world featherweight champions Salvador Sánchez and Eusebio Pedroza. However, Sánchez died while Camacho was still coming up in the ranks. In the junior-lightweight division, he defeated the top contenders Irleis Cubanito Perez, Melvin Paul, John Montes, and Refugio Rojas.

Super featherweight

When the World Junior Lightweight champion, Bobby Chacón, refused to go to Puerto Rico to defend his title against Camacho, the World Boxing Council (WBC) declared the world championship vacant. Rafael Limón, who had been defeated and lost the championship to Chacon, fought Camacho for the vacant title. It was the first time Camacho was in a ring with a former world champion; he scored a knockdown on Limón late in the third round and twice more in the fifth round before the referee stopped it.

Camacho also fought his first defense in San Juan, where he met Rafael Solis, a fellow Puerto Rican. He knocked out Solis with a right to the chin in round five, and retained the title.

Lightweight
Moving up to lightweight, Camacho won the United States Boxing Association title against Roque Montoya with a twelve-round decision. His victory in the next fight, broadcast on Home Box Office (HBO), made him a two-time world champion. Camacho beat the Mexican defending world champion, José Luis Ramírez in Las Vegas to win the WBC world Lightweight championship. Camacho dropped Ramirez in round three and won the fight by a unanimous twelve-round decision.

The two other reigning world champions in his division at that time, Livingstone Bramble and Jimmy Paul, were reluctant to unify the crown with Camacho. Instead, he beat Freddie Roach before his next fight of importance came along, ten months after beating Ramírez.

He met former WBC lightweight champion Edwin Rosario on June 13, 1986, at Madison Square Garden in New York City, a bout also broadcast on HBO. The fight was notable for the shifts of dominance between the men. Camacho dominated rounds one to four, but had to hang on in rounds five, six and seven, when he felt Rosario's power. He came back to take rounds eight and nine, but Rosario came back to take the last three rounds. It was a close fight, but Camacho retained the title by a split decision of the judges.

Camacho retained his title against Cornelius Boza-Edwards, a former world junior lightweight champion, in Miami in a unanimous decision, after dropping Edwards in the first round.

Light welterweight
He went up in weight and competed at the next level. After a few fights there, he met Ray "Boom Boom" Mancini, the former world lightweight champion who had a record of 29–3 with 23 knockouts, for the vacant WBO Light Welterweight title. Camacho was the fresher of the two and won a split twelve-round decision. He joined that exclusive group of world champion boxers who have become world champions in three weight divisions.

Camacho next met Vinny Pazienza, whom he defeated on points. His next challenger was Tony Baltazar, from Phoenix. He defeated Baltazar by points in a fight televised by HBO. His undefeated streak came to an end, and he lost his world championship to Greg Haugen, the former world Lightweight champion. The referee had deducted one point from Camacho for refusing to touch gloves with Haugen at the start of the 12th round. After the fight, an unidentified substance was found in Haugen's urine, and a rematch was ordered. Camacho regained the title, beating Haugen in a close split decision.

In 1992 in Las Vegas, Camacho met Julio César Chávez, a formidable Mexican champion who was undefeated 81–0. Camacho entered the ring in an outfit based on the Puerto Rican flag; the fight was televised by Showtime's Pay Per View. Camacho was later criticized by some in the boxing press for his retreating tactics during the fight; Chávez kept pushing the fight and harassed him with hard punches to the body. The bout ended with a victory for Chávez by unanimous decision.

Since 1992 Camacho's notable fights included two victories (by points) over Roberto Durán, (one in Atlantic City, the other in Denver). In 1997, he knocked out Sugar Ray Leonard in five rounds. This loss sent the forty-one-year-old Leonard into permanent retirement, putting an end to his third comeback attempt six years after a loss to Terry Norris in 1991.

Welterweight and later career
Camacho fought for the World Welterweight Championship against Félix Trinidad (1994) and Oscar De La Hoya (1997), but he lost both matches by unanimous decisions.

On December 5, 2003, Camacho faced Craig Houk. It was an odd fight, as Houk continuously turned his back on Camacho throughout the fight. Camacho had Houk in trouble in the first round before Houk caught an overzealous Camacho with a left hook and floored him, the third knockdown against him in his career. Camacho bounced back up and battered Houk for the remainder of the round. He knocked Houk near the end of the first and eventually won by knockout in round three. He won consecutive unanimous ten-round decisions over Clinton McNeil and Raúl Jorge Muñoz. After that, his boxing career went on hiatus, as he faced criminal charges. He pled guilty to burglary and acknowledged drug abuse, but was given probation.

Camacho returned to boxing on July 18, 2008, competing against Perry Ballard for the World Boxing Empire's Middleweight Championship. The fight lasted seven rounds. Camacho won when Ballard's corner threw the towel. Before this fight, Camacho was trained by Angelo Dundee. His last two fights resulted in a draw and a loss, against Luis Ramón Campas and Saúl Duran, respectively. His last fight against Duran was on May 14, 2010.

Later years and troubles

2005 burglary
On January 6, 2005, Camacho was arrested by police in Gulfport, Mississippi on charges of trying to burgle an electronic goods store and carrying the drug ecstasy on him. In 2007, he pleaded guilty to being under the influence at the time of the burglary. He was sentenced to 7 years in prison, but a judge eventually suspended all but one year of the sentence and gave Camacho probation. He served two weeks in jail after violating that probation.

2011 shooting
On February 12, 2011, Camacho was attacked near the Luis Lloréns Torres housing project in San Juan. Camacho said he was taking a friend to a nearby bar when two men approached his vehicle (a 2005 BMW X5) and tried to carjack him. When he tried to drive away, they shot at him three times.  He said that since "everybody loves me," he didn't think the men had realized who he was. He did not file a police report.

2012 shooting and death
On November 20, 2012, around 7 p.m. AST, Camacho was shot once in the jaw while sitting in a car, on Puerto Rico Highway 167, in Bayamón. Camacho, 50, was seated in the passenger seat of a friend's Ford Mustang when he was shot by unknown individuals from a passing SUV. The driver of the car, Adrian Mojica Moreno, Camacho's childhood friend, was killed in the attack. Camacho was taken to San Pablo Hospital in Bayamón, where he was reported to be in critical condition. Police said a chase took place and that the vehicle from which the shots were fired was found in the area of Jardines de Cataño. There were conflicting media reports, with an early claim that police arrested a suspect around 9 p.m. AST. Police investigating the incident said they found nine bags of cocaine in the car.

The bullet pierced Camacho's left mandible and fractured his fifth and sixth cervical vertebrae, lodging in his right shoulder and forming a lesion on his carotid artery that restricted blood flow to his brain. At one point doctors announced Camacho was expected to survive but might be paralyzed, but after he suffered a cardiac arrest during the night, doctors said they could find only minimal brain activity.  The morning after the shooting, Rafael Rodríguez Mercado, director of the Medical Sciences Campus, reported to El Nuevo Día that Camacho was brain stem dead. "His full recovery would be a miracle; medically there is nothing more that can be done," stated Rodríguez Mercado. This was confirmed the next morning by Ernesto Torres, director of the hospital.

Camacho's mother Maria Matias announced on November 23 plans to have her son taken off life support once his three remaining sons arrived in Puerto Rico to be with him. Héctor Camacho was officially declared dead after a heart attack the following day. It was not possible for any of his organs to be donated to recipients because of the time that had passed between him being found clinically brain dead and when his heart stopped.

He is survived by his parents, his sons, two grandsons, his brother Félix and his sisters Raquel, Estrella and Esperanza.  His oldest son, Hector Camacho Jr., said violence had overtaken Puerto Rico. "Death, jail, drugs, killings," he said. "That's what the streets are now."
Puerto Rico's former governor, Luis Fortuno, said "'Macho' will always be remembered for his spontaneity and charisma in and out of the ring." Puerto Rican governor-elect, Alejandro Garcia Padilla, said Camacho had "united the country"; "We celebrated his triumphs in the streets and we applauded him with noble sportsmanship when he didn't prevail."  Asked how he wished his son to be remembered, his father said for his clowning around and that he was a happy person, that he had revolutionized boxing by how he was dressed upon entering the ring.

Funeral and burial
After Camacho's death, his mother, María Matías, expressed the wish for her son to be buried in New York City, where he had grown up and started his fighting career. Camacho's son Héctor Camacho Jr. thought he should be buried in Puerto Rico, but agreed to his grandmother's and aunts' wishes.

Before being taken to the mainland United States, Camacho's body lay in state at the Puerto Rico Department of Sports and Recreation in Santurce. During the two days Camacho's body was on viewing, hundreds of people visited the facilities to pay tribute to the fighter.

Dozens of retired and active boxers from Puerto Rico and abroad were among those who participated in the funeral services. Among them were Félix "Tito" Trinidad, Wilfred Benítez, Wilfredo Gómez, John John Molina, Samuel Serrano, Román "Rocky" Martínez, Juan Manuel López, Nelson Dieppa, Alex "El Nene" Sánchez, Julian Solís, Manny Siaca, and the brothers McWilliams and McJoe Arroyo. Trinidad was outspoken in praise for his former rival, saying Camacho "put Puerto Rico's flag up high, with a lot of pride like many other champions have done. He was very loved. You can see how everybody has suffered the loss of this great human being, a great champion." Trinidad regretted the circumstances of the fatal shooting.

Camacho's body was flown to New York City on November 29 and presented at Elcock Funeral Home in Queens. On Friday, his body was taken to Saint Cecilia's Church in Manhattan for a religious service. Camacho was buried on December 1 in Saint Raymond's Cemetery in the Bronx. Before the burial, a parade was held in Camacho's honor in East Harlem. Two white horses pulled a hearse carriage up First Avenue surrounded by fans, friends and family of the late boxer. Camacho's casket was draped in a Puerto Rican flag. After a visitation and mass at St. Cecilia's Church on East 106th Street on November 30 and December 1, Camacho was buried on the afternoon of December 1, 2012, in Saint Raymond's Cemetery, Bronx in the Throggs Neck section of the Bronx.

Aftermath and investigation
Almost ten years later, on March 9, 2022, the Department of Justice of Puerto Rico arrested five suspects. William Rodríguez Rodríguez, Luis Ayala García, and Joshua Méndez Romero were serving federal sentences for unrelated crimes, and were flown in from Florida as part of what police called "Operation Knockout." The fourth suspect, Jesús Naranjo Adorno, was arrested in morning hours in the same city where Camacho was killed, and the fifth suspect, Juan Luis Figueroa Rivera, remains in prison in Puerto Rico for an unrelated case. Authorities also stated that two other suspects were killed in 2013 and 2015, in unrelated events.

Legacy and honors
Several sports journalists, analysts, and experts from Puerto Rico and United States have praised Camacho's skills and influence in the boxing world. The journalist Rafael Bracero and Francisco Valcárcel, president of the World Boxing Organization, agreed that Camacho was among the "Top 5 Puerto Rican boxers" of all time, along with Félix "Tito" Trinidad, Wilfredo Gómez, and Wilfred Benítez. The boxing historian, Mario Rivera Martinó, praised Camacho, calling him a "complete fighter" in the Lightweight division. José Sulaimán stated that he "revolutionized boxing during his time".

Ed Brophy, director of the International Boxing Hall of Fame, noted Camacho's talents in attracting an audience. He said, "Camacho brought a lot of excitement to boxing. He was bright, colorful, and always gave something to talk about with his walks to the ring, with his unique style of entering, and the costumes he wore." Brophy also praised Camacho's boxing skills, describing him as "an exciting fighter, and one of the greats. He faced the best, going up and down several divisions." Alfredo R. Martínez, senior editor of ESPN Deportes, also noted Camacho's flamboyant approach, saying that "if he wasn't the first, he was one of the firsts that entered the ring with extravagant costumes, feather crests, bright clothes, everything to the rhythm of some pop song".

Hiram Martínez, senior editor of ESPN Deportes, said about Camacho's training:

he transforms into a hungry, focused, and dedicated boxer, that works hours and hours polishing his speed, his wit, and the style that turned him into one of the greats of all time. That's the only way you can explain why all those great hitters he faced during the best moments of his career never knocked him down.

Jaime Vega-Curry (deputy editor of ESPN Deportes), said Camacho was "a character that combined a contagious charisma, impressive boxing quality, a child's soul, a salesman's shrewdness, and a superlative confidence on himself and in the force of his 'Macho Time'"

Brophy noted Camacho would be eligible for the International Boxing Hall of Fame in December 2015. He added that "Camacho is part of boxing history, and that's what the International Boxing Hall of Fame is about."

Camacho, along with Lupe Pintor and Hilario Zapata, among others, was voted into the International Boxing Hall of Fame in December 2015 and was inducted in June 2016.

Noted boxing biographer Christian Giudice wrote a book about Camacho's life titled Macho Time: The Meteoric Rise and Tragic Fall of Hector Camacho, which was released on October 20, 2020 by Hamilcar Publications.

Hector's fiancée, Shelly Salemassi, published a book of their real life story called The Lady and the Ten Time World Champ, Going The Distance With Hector Macho Camacho, which was released on December 1, 2021 by Page Publishing.

Marriage and family
Camacho had four sons, his oldest from an early relationship and three from his marriage. His eldest son, Héctor "Machito" Camacho Jr. (born 1978 in New York, when Camacho was 16), also became a professional boxer and has won a championship.

Camacho married Amy Torres in 1991, and they had three sons: Justin (born December 1, 1989), Christian (born 1992), and Tyler Camacho (born 1998). (The New York Times reports the youngest son's name as "Taylor".) In 1998 she obtained a restraining order against Camacho, alleging he had threatened her and one of their sons. They divorced in 2001. In March 2011, his ex-wife Amy Camacho and at least one son were living in Orange County, Florida when an argument between the boxer and his ex-wife caused neighbors to become alarmed and call police. His youngest son, Tyler, is also a boxer, as was his brother, Felix Camacho.

Together for 15 years, Hector was engaged to Shelly Salemassi. In 2003, The Press and Guide of Dearborn, Michigan printed an engagement notice between Camacho and Shelly Salemassi, along with a photograph of the couple.  Although they never married, the New York Post reported she was the only one of his former significant others to fly to Camacho's New York funeral.

Popular influence
During the peak of his career, Camacho became an icon in popular culture. He first appeared on Telemundo's Super Sábados, where he joined a musical sketch, "Macho Time", named after his catchphrase. During the 1990s, Camacho appeared in episodes of El Show del Mediodía, performing staged fights with Melwin Cedeño's character, Chevy, el Ponzoñú.

In 1992, Camacho invited Cedeño to sing a version with him of La Borinqueña before a fight, together with Pedro Guzmán, a fellow comedian/musician. The trio's publicity stunt drew strong criticism at the time. Camacho also appeared in the sitcom, The Wayans Bros., portraying Manuel "Hot Pepper" López. He staged a fight against the main character, Marlon "Suckerpunch" Williams (Marlon Wayans).

Due to his prominence, Camacho became the subject of cultural references in television, music and literature. Harry Mullan devoted a chapter to him, titled "It's Macho Time," in his The Book of Boxing Quotations (1988). In a 2003 episode of King of the Hill, titled "Boxing Luanne", the titular character Hank Hill remarks "Oh, I get it. A little flash… Like Héctor "Macho" Camacho". after placing tassels in the boxing outfit of Luanne Platter. Rapper Lil Wayne referred to Camacho and the professional wrestler "Macho Man" Randy Savage in his 2008 single, "Mr. Carter".

Following retirement, Camacho expanded his role as a television personality. In 2010, he took part in ¡Mira Quien Baila!, a reality show that is the American/Spanish-Speaking version of Dancing with the Stars. He was the first to be eliminated from the competition. Camacho later joined the Univision entertainment news program El Gordo y La Flaca as a Mira Quien Baila critic and entertainment world newscaster. In March 2012, Camacho starred on a dating game show titled It's Macho Time, where women competed to be his "girlfriend". Currently a written biography is being assembled by Emil "Rocco" Filerino, a lifelong friend and personal manager. Another biography, "Macho Time: The Meteoric Rise and Tragic Fall of Hector Camacho", by writer Christian Giudice, was published on October 20, 2020. In addition to those books, his son Hector Camacho, Jr. wrote a collaboration with author Dustin Warburton and illustrator Dan Monroe, a comic book named "Macho Dad" in which Camacho is portrayed as a son-carrying, Puerto Rican flag-wearing superhero. Macho Dad was released on September 1, 2014.
Hector's fiancée, Shelly Salemassi, published a book of their real life story called "The Lady and the Ten Time World Champ, Going The Distance With Hector Macho Camacho", which was released on December 1, 2021 by Page Publishing.

Professional boxing record

Pay-per-view bouts

See also

List of Puerto Ricans
List of boxing triple champions
List of Puerto Rican boxing world champions
Notable boxing families
 Sports in Puerto Rico

References

External links

Héctor Camacho Amateur Record at the BoxingRecords. Last updated March 1, 2006.

The Unsolved Murder of Hector Camacho

1962 births
2012 deaths
American people convicted of burglary
Burials at Saint Raymond's Cemetery (Bronx)
Converts to Christianity
Deaths by firearm in Puerto Rico
Male murder victims
International Boxing Hall of Fame inductees
Sportspeople from Bayamón, Puerto Rico
People from East Harlem
People murdered in Puerto Rico
Puerto Rican Christians
Southpaw boxers
World Boxing Council champions
World Boxing Organization champions
Puerto Rican murder victims
Puerto Rican male boxers
Welterweight boxers
Light-middleweight boxers
Middleweight boxers
World super-featherweight boxing champions
World lightweight boxing champions
World light-welterweight boxing champions
Super-middleweight boxers
2012 murders in Puerto Rico
People from Bayamón, Puerto Rico